Folk and traditional arts are rooted in and reflective of the cultural life of a community. They encompass the body of expressive culture associated with the fields of folklore and cultural heritage. Tangible folk art includes objects which historically are crafted and used within a traditional community. Intangible folk arts include such forms as music, dance and narrative structures. Each of these arts, both tangible and intangible, was originally developed to address a real need. Once this practical purpose has been lost or forgotten, there is no reason for further transmission unless the object or action has been imbued with meaning beyond its initial practicality. These vital and constantly reinvigorated artistic traditions are shaped by values and standards of excellence that are passed from generation to generation, most often within family and community, through demonstration, conversation, and practice.

It is these cultural artifacts, both tangible and intangible, that become the purview of the folklorist and cultural historian. They seek to understand the significance of these cultural forms within the community by studying their creation, transmission and performance, through which the values and structure of the community are expressed. It then becomes important to document these traditional acts and their meaning. Both community members and outsiders need to be educated as to the importance of these traditional objects and actions within the life of the community. And finally, the celebration of these arts needs to become an active demonstration and statement for the members of this community.

Performance folk arts

This category is part of the performing arts. These intangible folk art forms only became grouped as such in the second half of the 20th century, when the two terms "folklore performance" and "text and context" dominated discussions among folklorists. Performance is frequently tied to verbal and customary lore, whereas context is used in discussions of material lore. Both formulations offer different perspectives on the same folkloric understanding, specifically that folklore artifacts need to remain embedded in their cultural environment if we are to gain insight into their meaning for the community.

The concept of cultural (folklore) performance is shared with ethnography and anthropology among other social sciences. The cultural anthropologist Victor Turner identified four universal characteristics of cultural performance. These are playfulness, framing, using symbolic language and employing the subjunctive mood. In performance the audience leaves the daily reality to move into a mode of make-believe, "what if". That this fits well with all types of verbal lore, music, and movement, where reality finds little footing among the symbols, fantasies, and nonsense of traditional tales, proverbs, and jokes is self-evident. Customs and the lore of children and games also fit easily into the language of a folklore performance.

 Children's folklore
 Game studies
 Folk dance
 Folk music
 Folk song
 Game studies

Supporting organizations
The United Nations recognizes and supports cultural heritage around the world, in particular with the IOV International Organization of Folk Art, in partnership with UNESCO. Their declared mission is to “further folk art, customs and culture around the world through the organization of festivals and other cultural events, … with emphasis on dancing, folk music, folk songs and folk art.” By supporting international exchanges of folk art groups as well as the organization of festivals and other cultural events, their goal is promote international understanding and world peace.

In the United States, the National Endowment for the Arts works to promote greater understanding and sustainability of cultural heritage across the United States and around the world through research, education, and community engagement. As part of this, they identify and support NEA folk art fellows in quilting, ironwork, woodcarving, pottery, embroidery, basketry, weaving, along with other related traditional arts. The NEA guidelines define as criteria for this award a display of “authenticity, excellence, and significance within a particular tradition” for the artists selected.  (NEA guidelines) .”
In 1966, the NEA’s first year of funding, support for national and regional folk festivals was identified as a priority with the first grant made in 1967 to the National Folk Festival Association. Folklife festivals have long been celebrated around the world to encourage and support the education and community engagement of diverse ethnic communities.

Regional folk arts  
 African folk art
 Chinese folk art
 Mingei (Japanese folk art movement)
 Minhwa (Korean folk art)
 North Malabar
 Theyyam
 Tribal art
 Warli painting (India)
 Folk arts of Karnataka (India)
 Folk Art and Ethnological Museum of Macedonia and Thrace
 Folk Art Museum of Patras, Greece
 Native American Art

Associations
 Folk Art Society of America
 IOV International Organization of Folk Art, in partnership with UNESCO
 National Endowment for the Arts

References